E53  may refer to:
 BMW X5 (E53), the basis for the 1999 through 2006 BMW X5 Sports Activity Vehicle
 HMS E53, a British E class submarine
 European route E53, a road connecting Plzeň, Czech Republic and München, Germany